State Route 16 (SR-16) is a state highway in northeastern Utah, running for  in Rich County from the Wyoming state line near Woodruff to Sage Creek Junction. It serves as part of a road from Evanston, Wyoming to Jackson Hole, Wyoming.

Route description
SR-16 begins at the Wyoming state line south of Woodruff, as an extension of WYO 89, and heads northwest  to Woodruff, where it turns north through the town center.

SR-16 then continues north  to Randolph, running through the town center. North of Randolph, it runs generally north-northeast  to end at an intersection with SR-30 at Sage Creek Junction.

History
A 1921 law added the portion of the road from Evanston, Wyoming to Montpelier, Idaho in Utah to the state highway system, as well as the branch towards Kemmerer, Wyoming. The State Road Commission assigned the State Route 3 designation to the highway that decade, and in 1927 the legislature officially adopted the number for the main route and the spur. The spur was split off as SR-51 in 1931, but the remainder stayed as SR-3 until 1962, when it was renumbered SR-16. In the 1977 renumbering, only the section south of Sage Creek Junction remained, as the rest became SR-30 (signed since 1966) and US-89 (signed since the 1930s).

Major intersections

References

016
 016